"Juramento" is the second international single, after "Jaleo," taken from Ricky Martin's album Almas del Silencio (2003). It was released on September 15, 2003. The Spanglish version is called "Juramento (The Way to Love)". It is also the fourth overall single from Almas del Silencio.

Music video
The music video was directed by Joseph Kahn and starred American actress and model Jenna Dewan. There are two versions: one for the Spanish version and one for the Spanglish version. The video features Ricky Martin clones with some special effects reminiscent of The Matrix Reloaded and was filmed in the desert landscape of California.

Chart performance
The song reached number eleven in Spain, number forty-five in Italy, number fifty-seven in Switzerland and number ninety-two in Germany.

Formats and track listings
European mini CD single
"Juramento (The Way to Love)" (Javier Garza Radio Edit) (Spanglish) – 3:27  
"Juramento" (Pablo Flores Dub) – 7:45

European CD single
"Juramento (The Way to Love)" (Javier Garza Radio Edit) (Spanglish) – 3:27  
"Juramento" (Pablo Flores Radio Edit) (Spanish) – 4:03

European CD maxi-single
"Juramento (The Way to Love)" (Javier Garza Radio Edit) (Spanglish) – 3:27  
"Juramento (The Way to Love)" (Charles Dye Radio Edit) (Spanglish) – 3:19  
"Juramento (The Way to Love)" (Pablo Flores Club Mix) (Spanglish) – 8:49  
"Juramento" (Pablo Flores Radio Edit) (Spanish) – 4:03

Charts

References

2003 singles
2003 songs
Ricky Martin songs
Spanish-language songs
Macaronic songs
Songs written by George Noriega
Songs written by Jon Secada

th:มายเลิฟ (เพลงเซลีน ดิออน)